Tumor protein p53 pathway corepressor 1 (non-protein coding) is a non-protein coding gene that in humans is encoded by the TP53COR1 gene.

References

Further reading